The 2015–16 EHF Champions League group stage began on 16 September 2015 and concluded on 6 March 2016. A total of 28 teams competed for 14 places in the knockout stage of the 2015–16 EHF Champions League.

Draw
The draw for the group stage was held on 26 June 2015, 20:00 CEST, in the Vienna city centre. The 28 teams were drawn into four groups, two containing eight teams (Groups A and B) and two containing six teams (Groups C and D), with the restriction that teams from the same national association cannot face each other in the same group.

The group stage line-up was confirmed on 20 June 2015, allocating 16 teams to Groups A and B and the remaining 12 teams (11 + winner of qualification stage) to Groups C and D. The seedings were published on 24 June 2015, distributing the teams from Groups A and B into eight pots of two and the teams from Groups C and D into six pots of two. Title holders Barcelona Lassa and German champions THW Kiel were seeded in pot 1 of Groups A and B, while the winner of the qualification tournament was placed in pot 6 of Groups C and D. 

Because Germany qualified three teams, Flensburg-Handewitt (seeded in pot 8 of Groups A and B) were the only exception to the country restriction rule, as they were necessarily be drawn with one of the other German sides.

Notes

Format
In each group, teams played against each other in a double round-robin format, with home and away matches. After completion of the group stage matches, the teams advancing to the knockout stage were determined in the following manner:

Groups A and B – the top team qualified directly for the quarter-finals, and the five teams ranked 2nd–6th advance to the first knockout round.
Groups C and D – the top two teams from both groups contested a playoff to determine the last two sides joining the 10 teams from Groups A and B in the first knockout round.

Tiebreakers
In the group stage, teams were ranked according to points (2 points for a win, 1 point for a draw, 0 points for a loss). After completion of the group stage, if two or more teams have scored the same number of points, the ranking was determined as follows (article 4.3.1, section II of regulations):

Highest number of points in matches between the teams directly involved;
Superior goal difference in matches between the teams directly involved;
Highest number of goals scored in matches between the teams directly involved (or in the away match in case of a two-team tie);
Superior goal difference in all matches of the group;
Highest number of plus goals in all matches of the group;
If the ranking of one of these teams is determined, the above criteria are consecutively followed until the ranking of all teams is determined. If no ranking can be determined, a decision shall be obtained by EHF through drawing of lots.

During the group stage, only criteria 4–5 apply to determine the provisional ranking of teams.

Groups
The matchdays were 16–20 September, 23–27 September, 30 September–4 October, 7–11 October, 14–18 October, 21–25 October, 11–15 November, 18–22 November, 25–29 November and 2–6 December 2015. For Groups A and B, additional matchdays include 10–14 February, 17–21 February, 24–28 February and 2–6 March 2016.

Group A

Group B

Group C

Group D

Playoffs

Matches

Motor Zaporozhye won 70–67 on aggregate.

Meshkov Brest won 58–54 on aggregate.

References

External links
Official website

Group stage